This is a list of episodes for the fifth season of Everybody Loves Raymond.

Cast

Main 
Ray Romano as Raymond "Ray" Barone
Patricia Heaton as Debra (née Whelan) Barone
Brad Garrett as Robert Barone
Doris Roberts as Marie Barone
Peter Boyle as Francis "Frank" Barone
 Madylin Sweeten as Alexandra "Ally" Barone
Sawyer Sweeten and Sullivan Sweeten as Geoffrey Barone and Michael Barone

Recurring 
 Monica Horan as Amy McDougall
 Andy Kindler as Andy
 Jon Manfrellotti as Gianni 
 Katherine Helmond as Lois Whelan 
 Robert Culp as Warren Whelan
 Sherri Shepherd as Judy
 Alex Meneses as Stefania Fogagnolo
 David Proval as Marco Fogagnolo
 Suzie Plakson as Joanne Glotz

Ratings 
Everybody Loves Raymond's fifth season tied with Friends and Monday Night Football for the fifth most-viewed program of the 2000–01 television season, far higher that the previous year's #13 ranking for the 1999–2000 season; this was an incredibly unusual boost for an established show, with Marc Berman of Mediaweek stating that "I don't think I've seen such an improvement since Cheers." The season premiere garnered 22 million viewers, which was a record for the show. Rosenthal attributed the sudden increase in viewership to Survivor giving attention to Raymond's summer re-airings and Heaton's win of Outstanding Lead Actress in a Comedy Series at the 52nd Primetime Emmy Awards. Some of the season's episodes beat Monday Night Football airings in viewership. From November 2001 to the next month, viewership for the series grew 20%.

Reviews 
However, the season also received coverage for having zero female or minority directors involved, due to a January 2002 Directors Guild of America study showing an extreme amount of white males directing major network drama and comedy series (663 of 826 episodes).

Awards 
The fifth season on Everybody Loves Raymond won three Primetime Emmy Awards. Heaton won Outstanding Lead Actress in a Comedy Series for a second year in a row, and Roberts received Outstanding Supporting Actress in a Comedy Series. Brentley Walton, Doug Gray, Anthony Constantini, and Rick Himot won Outstanding Multi-Camera Sound Mixing for a Series or a Special for their work on "Italy," an episode that also gave nominations to Mike Berlin and Alessio Gelsini Torresi for Outstanding Cinematography for a Multi-Camera Series and Patricia Barnett for Outstanding Multi-Camera Picture Editing for a Comedy Series. The fifth season's other Emmy nominations included Outstanding Comedy Series, Outstanding Lead Actor in a Comedy Series for Romano, and Outstanding Supporting Actor in a Comedy Series for Boyle. 

The season won an American Comedy Award for Funniest Television Series, Romano nominated for Funniest Male Performer in a TV Series (Leading Role). He was also nominated for a Golden Globe Award for Best Actor in a Television Series Musical or Comedy, the last of only two nominations the series received throughout its nine-year run; he was nominated for the same award the previous year. The season obtained three wins at the 2001 TV Guide Award, including Favorite Comedy Series, Actor of the Year in a Comedy Series for Romano, and Supporting Actress of the Year in a Comedy Series for Roberts. At the same event, Heaton was nominated for Actress of the Year in a Comedy Series, and Garrett was nominated for Supporting Actor of the Year in a Comedy Series. 

At the 17th TCA Awards, the season was nominated for Outstanding Achievement in Comedy, and Romano was nominated for Individual Achievement in Comedy. The season was also nominated for a Family TV Comedy Series Young Artist Award, with Sweeten nominated for Best Performance in a TV Series (Comedy or Drama): Young Actress Age Ten or Under. As an ASCAP composer, Rick Marotta received a Top Television Series award from the company's Film and Television Music Awards for his music on the latter half of season four and the first half of season five. For writing "Ray's Journal," Jennifer Crittenden won a Humanitas Prize in the 30-minute show category.

Episodes

References

2000 American television seasons
2001 American television seasons
Everybody Loves Raymond seasons